Arthur H. Smith (born 1869) was an English-American architect who practiced in the small city of Rutland, Vermont.

Life and career
Smith was born in 1869 in London, and attended the University of Edinburgh. He immigrated to the United States in 1889, settling in Rutland in about 1892. He joined the office of Chappell & Burke, a civil engineering firm who wanted to expand to include architectural services, which Smith would provide. In 1895 John W. Burke left the firm, and Thomas F. Chappell and Smith formed a new partnership, Chappell & Smith. This firm was dissolved in about 1897.

Smith would go on to be the region's most prominent architect, practicing well into the 20th century.

Legacy
Two buildings designed by Smith have been individually placed on the National Register of Historic Places, and several more of his designs contribute to listed historic districts. Linden Terrace, designed by him in 1912, is one of his greatest architectural accomplishments.

Architectural works

For Chappell & Burke, before 1895
 1894 - Abraham Lincoln School, 110 Lincoln Ave, Rutland, Vermont
 1894 - Episcopal Church of Our Saviour, 316 Mission Farm Rd, Killington, Vermont

Chappell & Smith, 1895-1897
 1895 - Maclure Library, 840 Arch St, Pittsford, Vermont
 1896 - Arthur H. Smith House, 72 Crescent St, Rutland, Vermont
 The architect's own residence.
 1896 - James Walker House, 74 Crescent St, Rutland, Vermont
 1897 - Vergennes City Hall, 120 Main St, Vergennes, Vermont

Arthur H. Smith, from 1897
 1897 - Barlow Street School, 39 Barlow St, St. Albans, Vermont
 1897 - Messenger Street School, 75 Messenger St, St. Albans, Vermont
 1897 - St. Albans City Hall, 100 N Main St, St. Albans, Vermont
 1898 - Franklin County Jail, 30 Lincoln Ave, St. Albans, Vermont
 1898 - St. Albans Town Hall, 579 Lake Rd, St. Albans, Vermont
 1901 - Rutland City Hall, 52 Washington St, Rutland, Vermont
 1906 - Gryphon Building, 122 West St, Rutland, Vermont
 1906 - Tuttle-Caverly Block, 9-13 Center St, Rutland, Vermont
 1910 - Grand Theatre, 106 West St, Rutland, Vermont
 1912 - Herman W. Vaughan House (Linden Terrace), 191 Grove St, Rutland, Vermont
 1913 - E. Fred Massey House, 65 N Main St, Rutland, Vermont
 1914 - New Gryphon Building, 56 Merchants Row, Rutland, Vermont
 Home to Smith's offices.
 1922 - Ludlow Town Hall, 39 Depot St, Ludlow, Vermont
 1924 - Woodruff Hall, Castleton University, Castleton, Vermont
 1927 - Leavenworth Hall, Castleton University, Castleton, Vermont
 Burned in 1971.

References

1869 births
19th-century American architects
Architects from Vermont
Year of death missing
English emigrants to the United States
Architects from London